Throughout the Cold War, Ivory Coast's foreign policy was generally favorable toward the West. In particular, Félix Houphouët-Boigny kept relations with France that was among the closest between any African country and a former colonial power. The country became a member of the United Nations at independence in 1960 and participates in most of its specialized agencies. It is also an associate member of the European Union. In general, President Bédié initiated and maintained relations with many countries of the European Union and Asia. Ivory Coast maintains a wide variety of diplomatic contacts.

Houphouët-Boigny was one of the first African leaders to establish ties with Israel. In 1973, first Ethiopia, then the Organisation of African Unity (OAU), broke ties with Israel as an act of solidarity with Arab members of the OAU. Virtually all of Africa followed suit including Ivory Coast. However, it was one of the first to re-establish relations with Israel in 1986. However it also maintains diplomatic relations with Palestine.

Ivory Coast also sought change in South Africa through dialogue, and its newly named ambassador was among the first to be accredited to post-apartheid South Africa. Ivory Coast's foreign relations suffered following the December 1999 coup that brought President Guei to power. Many foreign institutions (including the IMF) withheld foreign aid.

Most of the western international community, as well as the OAU, considered the October 2000 elections to have been seriously flawed. Foreign donor institutions which halted aid pending a return to civilian rule have largely continued their freeze. The London Club has also not expressed a willingness to revisit the issue of debt rescheduling. The electoral shifts in the country therefore continue to mar foreign relations.

Regional and international assistance, however, helped to end the conflict in 2002, and to bring about the establishment of a power sharing government in 2003. The cooperative stance augurs well for Ivory Coast's foreign relations.

Regional relations

The Ivorian government has historically played an important and constructive role in Africa. President Houphouët-Boigny was active in the mediation of regional disputes, most notably in Liberia and Angola. Ivory Coast is a member of the newly created OAU conflict resolution mechanism. In 1996-97 Ivory Coast sent a medical unit to participate in regional peacekeeping in Liberia, its first peacekeeping effort.

Ivory Coast is a member of the Organisation of African Unity (OAU), the West African Economic and Monetary Union (UEMOA), the African Mauritian Common Organization (OCAM), the Council of Entente Communaute Financiere Africaine (CFA), the Economic Community of West African States (ECOWAS), the Nonaggression and Defense Agreement (ANAD), INTELSAT, the Nonaligned Movement, the African Regional Satellite Organization (RASCOM), the Inter-African Coffee Organizations (IACO), the International Cocoa Organization (ICCO), the Alliance of Cocoa Producers, African, Caribbean and Pacific Countries (ACP), and the Association of Coffee Producing Countries (ACPC). Ivory Coast also belongs to the European Investment Bank (EIB) and the African Development Bank.

Note: The political uprising of 2002 evoked critical regional dissonance, as well as incidences of xenophobia against nationals of neighboring countries residing in Ivory Coast. The long-term effects of this situation remained unknown in 2006.

Other important relations

In the past decade, Indo-Ivorian relations have considerably expanded as India seeks to develop an extensive commercial and strategic partnership in the West African region. Ivory Coast opened its resident mission in New Delhi in September 2004. Both nations are currently fostering efforts to increase trade, investments and economic cooperation.

United States-Ivorian relations were friendly and close up until the time of the coup in 1999. While many other countries in the region were undergoing repeated military coups, experimenting with Marxism, and developing ties with the Soviet Union and China, Ivory Coast, under former president Houphouët -Boigny, maintained a close political allegiance to the West. Having served as Ivory Coast's first ambassador to the U.S., former president Bédié was also familiar with the United States.

The United States was sympathetic to Ivory Coast's program of rapid, orderly economic development based on austerity measures as well as its moderate stance on international issues. However, bilateral U.S. Agency for International Development (USAID) funding, with the exception of self-help and democratization funds, has been phased out.

On hold is the cultural exchange the United States and Ivory Coast maintained, through which prominent Ivorian government officials, media representatives, educators and scholars visit the United States to become better acquainted with the American people and to exchange ideas and views with their American colleagues.

Following the decision to bar the majority of parties from the October election, the United States removed all election observers and electoral funding. The U.S. also boycotted the swearing-in ceremony of President Gbagbo. The growing ties between Ivory Coast and Libya under President Gbagbo was seen as likely further harm U.S.-Ivorian relations. The political difficulties of 2002 have left Gbagbo in charge of a temporary power-sharing government in anticipation of new elections. In 2006, it remained difficult to know what the long-term effects would be.

Bilateral relations

Africa

Americas

Asia

Europe

Oceania

See also
List of diplomatic missions in Ivory Coast
List of diplomatic missions of Ivory Coast

References